El despertar is a Mexican telenovela produced by Ernesto Alonso for Telesistema Mexicano in 1966.

Cast 
María Rivas as Nora
Guillermo Murray as Freddy
Adriana Roel as Katia
Hector Andremar as Horacio
Fanny Schiller as Lola
Prudencia Griffel as Doña Remedios
Susana Freyre
Chela Castro
Enrique Rambal
Carlos Fernández

References

External links 

Mexican telenovelas
1966 telenovelas
Televisa telenovelas
Spanish-language telenovelas
1966 Mexican television series debuts
1966 Mexican television series endings